VF-01 was a sub-orbital spaceflight of the SpaceShipTwo-class VSS Unity that took place on 22 February 2019, piloted by David Mackay and co-piloted by Mike Masucci. It was operated by Virgin Galactic, a private company led by Richard Branson that intends to conduct space tourism flights in the future. Following VSS Unity VP-03, VF-01 was a demonstration of the craft's ability to carry passengers. Virgin Galactic's chief astronaut trainer Beth Moses acted as a test passenger, evaluating the experience for potential customers.

Crew

Flights are currently only by U.S Convention.

Flight

On 22 February 2019, Unity's mother ship VMS Eve carried it into flight in a parasite configuration. Shortly before 9 a.m., Unity was drop launched. This altitude surpassed the 50-mile limit used in the United States to denote the limit of space, but fell short of the Kármán line. Both craft landed safely afterwards. During flight, Moses unstrapped from her seat and experienced weightlessness. Per the U.S. convention, Moses was also the first woman aboard a commercial spacecraft.

References

2019 in California
2019 in spaceflight
2019 in aviation
SpaceShipTwo
Test spaceflights
Aviation history of the United States
History of the Mojave Desert region
Mojave Air and Space Port
Suborbital human spaceflights
February 2019 events in the United States